The Gaddang (an indigenous Filipino people) are a linguistically-identified ethnic group resident in the watershed of the Cagayan River in Northern Luzon, Philippines. Gaddang speakers were recently reported to number as many as 30,000. This number may not include another 6,000 related Ga'dang speakers and other isolated linguistic-groups whose vocabulary is more than 75% identical.

The members of several proximate groups speaking mutually-intelligible dialects (including Gaddang, Ga'dang, Baliwon, Cauayeno, Yogad, as well as now-lost historically-documented tongues such as that once spoken by the Irray of Tuguegarao) today are depicted as a single people in history and cultural literature, and in government documents. The language is very similar to that of the Itawes and Malaueg settled at the mouths of the Matalag and Chico rivers. Distinctions are asserted between (a) the Christianized "lowlanders" of Isabela and Nueva Vizcaya, and (b) the formerly non-Christian residents in the nearby Cordillera mountains. Some sources exaggerate these differences, which may be completely ignored or glossed-over by others. The Gaddang have in the past also used a variety of social mechanisms to incorporate individuals born to linguistically-different peoples. The Gaddang identity is their place and their language.

The Gaddang are indigenous to a compact geographic area; the theatre for their history is an area smaller than one-half million hectares (extreme distances: Bayombong to Ilagan=120 Km, Echague to Natonin=70 Km).  The population collectively comprises less than one-twentieth of one percent (.0005) of the Philippines' population.

Physical Geography 

The Cagayan Valley (with the tributary watersheds of the Magat, Ilagan, the Mallig and Siffu of the Mallig Plains, and the Chico which enters the Cagayan just 30 miles from the sea) is cut-off from the rest of Luzon by heavily-forested mile-high mountain ranges that join at Balete Pass near Baguio. If one travels south from the mouth of the Cagayan River and then along its largest tributary (the Magat), the surrounding mountains become a dominant, brooding presence. The terraced Cordilleras close in from the west, then the darker reaches of northern Sierra Madre arise in the east, meeting at the river sources in the Caraballo Mountains.

Historically shrouded in continuous rainforest, today the valley-floor is a patchwork of intensive agriculture and mid-size civic centers surrounded by hamlets and small villages. Even remote locations in the surrounding mountains now have permanent farm-establishments, all-weather roads, cell-phone towers, mines, and established markets. Much native forest-flora has vanished, and any uncultivated areas sprout invasive cogon or other weeds.

The International Fund for Agricultural Development in its 2012 study on Indigenous People's Issues in the Philippines identifies populations of Gaddang (including Baliwon, Majukayong, and Yogad) in Isabela, Nueva Ecija, Nueva Vizcaya, Quirino, and Mountain Provinces.

Linguistic Geography 
The Cagayan Valley is physically divided from the rest of Luzon; Cagayan Valley cultures and languages are separated from other Luzon cultures and languages by social geography. The homelands of the Kapampangan (2.7 million speakers) and Pangasinan (1. 8 million) lie south of the mountains between the Cagayan and the enormous Tagalog-speaking population of Central Luzon - and are themselves barred from the valley by the diverse Igorot/Ilongot peoples of the Cordilleras and Caraballos. East of the valley, Kasiguranin farmers and various Aeta (Negrito) hunter-gatherers inhabit a few small communities in the Sierra and along the seashore. Many 17th and 18th century Ilokano (now 8,000,000 worldwide) left their homes on the northwest coast to labor on Cagayan Valley plantations; today they outnumber the original peoples of the Cagayan several times over.

Evidence is that Gaddang occupied this vast protected valley jointly with culturally-similar Ibanag, Itawis, Isneg, and Malaueg peoples for many hundred years; yet even among this half-million-plus , Gaddang peoples are fewer than ten percent.

Gaddang identity has survived invasion, colonialism, suppression, assimilation, and nationalism.  17th century Spanish religious tried to make Ibanag the sole official medium for communication and education throughout the area, hoping both preaching gospel and civil administration would be more effective. The Provincial Chapter of the Dominicans (in charge of evangelizing the Cagayan Valley) decreed in 1607: "Praecipientes ut omni studio et diligentia dent operam, ut linguam de Ibanag loquantur Yndi omnes, et in illa dictis indis ministrare studeant." Nevertheless, Gaddangic languages (including Yogad and Cauayan) continued to remain vital, and distinct from Ibanag and Isneg.  This situation persists in linguistic catalogs just as it continued in the southern Cagayan and Magat valleys and foothills of the Cordillera. Decades of vocabulary studies document significant identity among them, while similar studies reveal much less intelligibility with their Ibanag and Isneg neigbhors.

Evolving the Idea of a People 
Early Spanish depictions of Philippines were written by conquerors to serve evangelical, military, or administrative purposes. The writers ignore scientific rules of evidence, and can be unreliable about conditions. There are no native reporters whose work survives. Consequently, descriptions from this period are a cultural overlay imposed by foreign invaders on indigenous population. These are features introduced to promote the interests of Church, Crown, and the business of the local governing apparatus, and they entirely fail to reflect native concepts. In 1902, the US Commissioner for Non-Christian Tribes wrote:

This means there was no "Gaddang people" prior to the Spanish incursion; merely inhabitants of evanescent forest hamlets with tenuous relationships to inhabitants of other proto-villages. Languages and customs might be shared with neighbors, or they might not. Only the arrival of Spanish military and the church caused denomination of certain villages as combined people.

At the end of the Spanish period, Fr. Julian Malumbres was writing his Historia de Nueva-Vizcaya y Provincia Montanõsa (published after the American takeover), which carefully details the doings of the individual priests, administrators, and military persons throughout the several hundred years of the occupation.  He is fairly vague about actions and customs of the native population.

American businessman Frederic H. Sawyer lived in Central Luzon beginning in 1886. He compiled The Inhabitants of the Philippines from official, religious, and mercantile sources during the last years of the Spanish administration. Published in 1900, it was intended to be a resource for incoming Americans. His descriptions are meager and at best secondhand. In his section titled Gaddanes we recognize the pagan residents of the highlands. The residents of Bayombong, Bambang, Dupax, and Aritao, however, are called Italones, while their like in Isabela are the Irayas and the Catalanganes.  These very terms are shown on military maps used by General Otis and his staff during the Philippine–American War.

In 1917, respected University of the Philippines ethnologist/anthropologist H. Otley Beyer reported 21,240 Christian Gaddang ("civilized and enjoying complete self-government") and 12,480 Pagan Gaddang ("semi-sedentary agricultural groups enjoying partial self-government). In this text, Beyer specifically notes that the Gaddang language "is divided into many dialects", and also that all groups have a "marked intonation while speaking".  He broke the Christian group into 16,240 Gaddang-speakers and 5,000 Yogad-speakers. Some Pagan Gaddang spoke Maddukayang/Majukayang (or Kalibungan) - a group totalling 8,480 souls. There were also 2,000 whose language was Katalangan (an Austronesian and Aeta group farming the foothills of the Sierra Madre in San Mariano, initially described in 1860 by naturalist Carl Semper), and another 2,000 speaking "Iraya" (not to be confused with the language of the Mangyans of Mindoro, but probably intended to refer to the Cordilleran Irray.).

A 1959 article by Fr. Godfrey Lambrecht, CICM is prefaced:

The 1960 Philippine Census reported 6,086 Gaddang in the province of Isabela, 1,907 in what was then Mountain Province, and 5,299 in Nueva Vizcaya. Using this data, Mary Christine Abriza wrote:

Pre-history 
Archeologists working in Penablanca have dated the presence of humans in the Cagayan Valley as early as one-half million years ago. As early as 2000 B.C., Taiwanese nephrite (jade) was worked along the north coast of Luzon and in the Batanes, particularly at the Nagsabaran site in Claveria, although this international industry moved to Palawan by 500 CE. 

The subsequent human prehistory of Luzon is subject to significant disagreements on origins and timing, and on-going genetic studies have yet to be conclusive.  Generally agreed, however, is that a series of colonizing parties of Austronesian peoples arrived from 200 B.C. to 300 A.D. along the northern coasts of Luzon, where the valleys of the Cagayan and its tributaries were covered with dense old-growth rain-forest with an extraordinarily diverse flora and fauna. They found the Cagayan River watershed sparsely occupied by long-established Negrito Aeta/Arta peoples, while the hills had become home to more-recently arrived Cordilleran people (thought to originate directly from Taiwan as late as 500 B.C.) and possibly the fierce, mysterious Ilongot in the Caraballos.

Unlike either the Aeta hunter-gatherer or Cordilleran terrace-farmers, the Indo-Malay colonists of this period practiced swidden farming, and primitive littoral/riparian economies - societies that favor low population-density and frequent relocations. Social structure accompanying these practices is rarely developed beyond the extended family group (according to Turner), and is often non-existent beyond the limits of a single settlement. Such societies typically foster suspicion of (and hostility towards) outsiders, making members relocate in the face of population pressure.

The Indo-Malay arrived in separate small groups during this half-millennium, undoubtedly speaking varying dialects; time and separation have indubitably promoted further linguistic fragmentation and realignment. Over generations they moved inland into valleys along the Cagayan River and its tributaries, pushing up into the foothills. The Gaddang occupy lands remote from the mouth of the river, so they are likely to have been among the earliest to arrive. All descendent-members of this 500-year-long migration, however, share elements of language, genetics, practices, and beliefs. Ethnologists have recorded versions of a shared "epic" depicting describing the arrival of the heroes Biwag and Malana (in some versions from Sumatra), their adventures with magic bukarot, and depictions of riverside life, among the Cagayan Valley populations including the Gaddang. Other cultural similarities include familial collectivism, the dearth of endogamous practices, and a marked indifference to, or failure to understand intergenerational conservation of assets. These socially-flexible behaviors tend to foster a high individual survival rate, but do relatively little to establish and maintain a strongly-differentiated continuity for each small group.

It is understood that the low level of social organization in Cagayan Luzon was why the seafaring trade networks of Srivijaya and Majapahit established no lasting stations, nor were the merchants of Tang and Song China attracted by the undeveloped markets and lack of industry in the area. In the 14th century, when the short-lived and ineffective Mongol Yuan dynasty collapsed in a series of plagues, famines, and other disasters; it led to the Ming policy of Haijin ("isolation"), and a substantial increase in Wokou piracy in the Luzon Straits. Unsettled conditions continued for several hundred years, putting a halt to any nascent international trade and immigration in the Cagayan watershed, and sequestering the inhabitants until the arrival of better-armed Spanish adventurers in the late 1500s.

History 
Material specifically relevant to the Gaddang as a whole (especially if semi-distinct groups like Cauayeno and Yogad are included) over the past four centuries is meagre.  Important parts of the Gaddang story is lost today due to the ravages of armed conflict, careless or disinterested record-keeping and maintenance during inconstant administration, and lack of documentary interest and ability in the collective population.  Extant historical data are largely concerned with specific places and events (property-records, parish vital statistics, &c.), or describe critical developments that affected large areas and populations. Such records provide context and continuity, however, to understanding the background for the sporadic appearances of the Gaddang in the records.

Spanish arrival
The initial recorded census of Filipinos was conducted by the Spanish, based on tribute collection from Luzon to Mindanao in 1591 (26 years after Legazpi established the Spanish colonial administration); it found nearly 630,000 native individuals. Prior to Legazpi, the islands had been visited by Magellan's 1521 expedition and the 1543 expedition of Villalobos. Using the reports of these expeditions, augmented by archeological data, scientific estimates of the Philippines population at the time of Legazpi's arrival run from slightly more than one million to nearly 1.7 million.

Even if we allow for inefficiencies in the early Spanish census methodology, data support a claim that - over a mere quarter-century - military action and disease caused a major population decline (perhaps 40% or more) among the native population . It is obvious the arrival of the Spanish (with their arms and diseases) was a cataclysmic event throughout all the islands. (To comprehend such dislocation, you may read of the effects - on a much smaller arena - brought by modern roads and agricultural technology during the late 20th century on tiny highlands Gaddang communities).

There is no doubt the Spanish occupation imposed a entirely different and incomprehensible social and economic order from that which had previously existed in the Cagayan valley. Missions and encomienda-ranching introduced concepts of land tenure sophisticated beyond the native's usufruct system of barely organized barangay communities farming temporary patches in the forest. The Church and Crown demanded regular tributes of goods and services without any recompense apparent to the indigenes; the invaders viewed elusive natives as property and a resource to be exploited. Evanescent woodland hamlets and tiny, exclusive societies stood in the way of Spanish plans for economic exploitation of their new acquisition - they impeded commercial agriculture in particular. Trails through the forest became roads, towns, and churches came into existence, new skills and social distinctions sprang into being, while old manners and folkways were forced into disuse within a single generation.

Occupation by Spain and the Catholic Church

In the Cagayan and nearby areas most immediately affecting the Gaddang, early expeditions led by Juan de Salcedo in 1572, and Juan Pablo de Carrión (who drove-away Japanese pirates infesting the Cagayan coast) initiated Spanish interest in the valley. Carrión established the alcalderia of Nueva Segovia in 1585.  The natives immediately commenced what the Spanish considered anti-government revolts which flared up from the 1580s through the 1640s. At least a dozen "rebellions" were documented in Northern and Central Luzon from the 1600s through the 1800s, actions that indicate continuing antipathy between the occupiers and native populations.

Resistance notwithstanding, Spanish religious/military force established encomienda grants as far south as Tubigarao by 1591; in the same year Luis Pérez Dasmariñas (son of then-governor Gómez Pérez Dasmariñas) led an expedition north over the Caraballo mountains into present-day Nueva Vizcaya and Isabela. In 1595-6 the Diocese of Nueva Segovia was decreed, and Dominican missionaries arrived. The Catholic Church forcefully proselytized the Cagayan Valley from two directions, with Dominican missionaries continuing to open new missions southward in the name of Nueva Segovia (notably assisted by troops under the command of Capitan Fernando Berramontano), while Augustinian friars pushing north from Pangasinan following the trail of the Dasmarinas expedition founded a mission near Ituy by 1609.  The Seventeenth century began with the Gaddang in the sights of the Spanish advance for land and mineral wealth.

The Gaddang entered written history in 1598 after the Dominican order founded the mission of San Pablo Apostol in Pilitan (now a barangay of Tumauini), then the mission of St. Ferdinand in the Gaddang community of Abuatan, Bolo (now the rural barangay of Bangag, Ilagan City), in 1608 - thirty years (and thirty leagues) from the first Spanish settlements in the Cagayan region.   Missions sent south from Nueva Segovia continued to prosper and expand southward, eventually reaching the Diffun area (southern Isabela and Quirino) by 1702. Letters from the Dominican Provincial Jose Herrera to Ferdinand VI explicitly inform us that military activity was financed by (and considered an integral part of) the missions.

Forced introduction of new crops and farming practices alienated the indigenes, as did collection of tithes, shares, and tribute. 1608 saw the assassination of Pilitan encomediero Luis Enriquez for his severe treatment of the Gaddang.  In 1621, residents of Bolo led by Felipe Catabay and Gabriel Dayag commenced a Gaddang (or Irraya) Revolt against the severe Church requisitions of labor and supplies, as Magalat had rebelled against Crown tribute at Tuguegarao a generation earlier. Spanish religious and military records tell us that residents burned their villages and the church, then removed to the foothills west of the Mallig River (several days' journey). A generation later, Gaddang returnees — at the invitation of Fray Pedro De Santo Tomas — reestablished communities at Bolo and Maquila, though the location was changed to the opposite side of the Cagayan from the original village. Authorities claimed the Gaddang Revolt effectively over with the first mass held by the Augustinians on 12 April 1639 in Bayombong, Nueva Vizcaya, the so-called "final-stronghold" of the Gaddangs.

This protest/revolt created a distinction between the "Christianized" and "non-Christian" Gaddang. Bolo-area Gaddang sought refuge with mountain tribes who had consistently refused to abandon traditional beliefs and practices for Catholicism. The Igorots of the Cordilleras killed Father Esteban Marin in 1601; subsequently, they waged a guerrilla resistance after Captain Mateo de Aranada burned their villages. The mountaineers accepted the fleeing Gaddang as allies against the Spanish. Although the Gaddang refused to grow rice in terraces (preferring to continue their swidden economy), they learned to build tree-homes and hunt in the local style. Many Gaddang eventually returned to the valley, however, accepting Spain and the Church to follow the developing lowlands-farming lifestyle, taking advantage of material benefits not available to residents of the hills.

Heading north over the mountains, the Ituy mission initially baptized Isinay and Ilongot; thirty years later services were also being held for Gaddang in Bayombong. By the 1640s, though, that mission was defunct - the Magat valley was not operated with the comprehensive encomienda organization (and the military force that accompanied it) seen in the Nueva Segovia missions. The 1747 census, however, enumerates 470 native residents (meaning adult male Christians) in Bayombong and 213 from Bagabag, all said to be Gaddang or Yogad, in a reestablished mission (now called Paniqui). With more than 680 households (3,000–4,500 people), the substantial size of these two Magat Valley Gaddang towns (100 kilometers from present-day Ilagan City) is an argument for more than a century's existence of a major native population in the area. By 1789, the Dominican Fr. Francisco Antolin made estimates of the Cordilleran population; his numbers of Gaddang in Paniqui are ten thousand, with another four thousand in the Cauayan region.

The Gaddang are mentioned in Spanish records again in connection with the late-1700s rebellion of Dabo against the royal tobacco monopoly; it was suppressed in 1785 by forces dispatched from Ilagan by Governor Basco, equipped with firearms.  Ilagan City was by then the tobacco industry's financing and warehousing center for the Valley. Tobacco requires intense cultivation, and Cagayan natives were considered too few and too primitive to provide the needed labor. Workers from the western coastal provinces of Ilocos and Pangasinan were imported for the work. Today, descendants of those 18th and 19th-century immigrants (notably the Ilokano) outnumber by 7:1 descendants of the aboriginal Gaddang, Ibanag, and other Cagayan valley peoples.

In the final century of Spain's rule of the islands saw the administration of the Philippines separated from that of Spain's American possessions, opening Manila to international trade, and the 1814 resumption of royal supremacy in government. Royal reform and re-organization of the Cagayan government and economy began with the creation of Nueva Vizcaya province in 1839. In 1865, Isabela province was created from parts of Cagayan and Nueva Vizcaya. The new administrations further opened Cagayan Valley lands to large-scale agricultural concerns funded by Spanish, Chinese, and wealthy Central Luzon investors, attracting more workers from all over Luzon.

But the initial business of these new provincial governments was dealing with head-hunting incursions that started in the early 1830s and continued into the early years of American rule. Tribesmen from Mayoyao, Silipan, and Kiangan ambushed travellers and even attacked towns from Ilagan to Bayombong, taking nearly 300 lives. More than 100 of the victims were Gaddang residents of Bagabag, Lumabang, and Bayombong. After Dominican Fr. Juan Rubio was decapitated on his way to Camarag, Governor Oscariz of Nueva Vizcaya led a force of more than 340 soldiers and armed civilians against the Mayoyao, burning crops and three of their villages. The Mayoyao sued for peace, and afterward, Oscariz led his troops through the hills as far as Angadanan. By 1868, however, the governors of Lepanto, Bontoc, and Isabela provinces repeated the expedition through the Cordilleran highlands to suppress a new wave of headhunting.

During the Spanish period, education was entirely a function of the Church, intended to convert indigenes to Catholicism.  Although the throne decreed instruction was to be in Spanish, most friars found it easier to work in local tongues. This practice had the dual effect of maintaining local dialects/languages while suppressing Spanish literacy (minimizing the acquisition of individual social and political power, and suppressing national identity) among rural natives. The Education Decree of 1863 changed this, requiring primary education (and establishment of schools in each municipality) while requiring the use of Spanish language for instruction. Implementation in remote areas of Northern Luzon, however, had not materially begun by the revolution of 1898.

Early in the Aguinaldo revolution, the main actions of the insurgents in the Cagayan Valley area were incursions by irregular Tagalog forces led by Major (later Colonel) Simeon Villa (Aguinaldo's personal physician, appointed the military commander of Katipunan troops in Isabela), Major Delfin, Colonel Leyba, and members of the family of Gov. Dismas Guzman who were accused of robbery, torture, and killing of Spanish government functionaries, Catholic priests and their adherents, for which banditry several officers were later tried and convicted. This characterization has been disputed by the American Justice James Henderson Blount, who served as U.S. District Judge in the Cagayan region 1901-1905. Regardless of the truth of the accusations and counter-accusations we may be certain that - in the area from Ilagan to Bayombong inhabited by Gaddang people - violence by outsiders and local-officials for and against Spanish-government adherents inevitably affected the daily lives of those living in the area.

American occupation 

The Philippines became a United States possession with the Treaty of Paris which ended the Spanish–American War in 1898.

The First Philippine Republic (primarily Manila-based illustrados and the principales who supported them) objected to the American claim to dispose of Philippine land-holdings throughout the islands, which voided grants made to Spain and the church by indigenes, but also eliminated communal ancestral holdings. What Filipino nationalists regarded as continuing their struggle for independence, the U.S. government considered as insurrection. Aguinaldo's forces were driven out of Manila in February 1899 and retreated through Nueva Ecija, Tarlac, and eventually (in October) to Bayombong. After a month, though, Republic headquarters left Nueva Vizcaya on its final journey which would end in Palanan, Isabela, (captured by Philippine Scouts recruited from Pampanga) in March 1901. Gaddangs made few or none of the principales and none of the Manila oligarchy, but the action in Nueva Vizcaya and Isabela made them proximate to the agonies of the rebellion.

Perhaps the earliest official reference to the Gaddang during the American Occupation directs the reader to "Igorot". The writers said of the "non-Christian" mountain tribes:  Among the practices of these Igorot peoples was headhunting.

The Census also catalogues populations of the Cagayan lowlands, with theories about the origins of the inhabitants, saying: 

The problematic but influential D. C. Worcester arrived in the Philippines as a zoology student in 1887, he was subsequently the only member of both the Schurman Commission and the Taft Commission. He travelled extensively in Benguet, Bontoc, Isabela, and Nueva Vizcaya, codified and reviewed early attempts to catalogue the indigenous peoples in The Non-Christian Tribes of Northern Luzon; he collects "Calauas, Catanganes, Dadayags, Iraya, Kalibugan, Nabayuganes, and Yogades" into a single group of non-Christian "Kalingas" (an Ibanag term for 'wild men' - not the present ethnic group) with whom the lowland ("Christian") Gaddang are also identified.

 When the U.S. took the Philippines from the Spanish in 1899, they instituted what President McKinley promised would be a "benign assimilation". Governance by the U.S. military energetically promoted physical improvements, many of which remain relevant today. The Army built roads, bridges, hospitals, and public buildings, improved irrigation and farm production, constructed and staffed schools on the U.S. model, and invited missionary organizations to establish colleges. Most importantly, these improvements affected the entire country, not just primarily the environs of the capital. The infrastructure improvements made great changes in the lives of the "Christianized" Gaddang in Nueva Vizcaya and Isabela (although they assuredly had a much smaller effect on the Gaddang in the mountains). The 1902 Land Act and the government purchase of 166,000 hectares of Catholic church holdings also affected the Cagayan Valley peoples.

In addition, the passage in 1916 of the Jones Act redirected almost all U.S. efforts in the Philippines, making them focus on a near-term when Filipinos would be in charge of their own destinies. This initiated promotion of social reforms from the Spanish traditions. Food safety regulations and inspection, programs to eradicate malaria and hookworm, and expanded public education were particular American projects that affected provincial Northern Luzon. A practical decision was made to immediately conduct education in English, a practice finally discontinued only twenty-five years after independence.

During the first years of the 20th century, American administrators documented several cases throughout the islands of Filipino individuals being involved in the sale or purchase of Ifugao or Igorot women and girls to be domestic servants. 
The regular sale of "non-Christian" Cordilleran and Negrito tribesfolk to work as farm labor in Isabela and Nueva Vizcaya was documented (a practice noted even during the Spanish administration), and several Gaddang were listed as purchasers. While household slaves often were treated as lesser members of Filipino families, problems was exacerbated by sale of slaves to Chinese residents doing business in the Philippines. When Governor George Curry arrived in Isabela in 1904, he endeavored to enforce the Congressional Act prohibiting slavery in the Philippines but complained the Commission provided no penalties. The practice — considered to be of centuries-long standing — was effectively discouraged de jure by 1920.

In 1908, the Mountain Province administrative district was formed, incorporating the municipality of Natonin, and its barangay (now the municipality) of Paracelis on the upper reaches of the Mallig River, as well the Ifugao municipality of Alfonso Lista uphill from San Mateo, Isabela. These areas were the home of the Ga'dang-speaking Irray and Baliwon peoples, mentioned in the early Census as "non-Christian" Gaddang. A particular charge of the new province's administration was the suppression of head-hunting.

In 1901, the U. S. Army began to recruit counter-insurgency troops in the Philippines. Many Gaddang took advantage of this opportunity, and joined the Philippine Scouts as early as 1901 (more than 30 Gaddang joined the original force of 5,000 Scouts), and continued to do so through the late 1930s. The Scouts were deployed at the Battle of Bataan, most were not in their homelands during the Japanese Occupation. One Gaddang 26th Cavalry private, Jose P. Tugab, claimed he fought in Bataan, escaped to China on a Japanese ship, was with Chiang Kai-shek at Chunking and US/Anzac forces in New Guinea, then returned to help free his own Philippine home.

Japanese occupation and WWII 
The Japanese began implementing a policy of economic penetration of the Philippines immediately after the American occupation began, concentrating particularly on acquiring land in agriculturally under-developed areas in Mindanao, and providing labor for construction in the mountains of northern Luzon as well. The construction of Baguio, beginning in 1904, attracted more than 1,000 Japanese nationals who eventually owned farms, retail businesses, and transport. Land ownership under the Public Land act of 1903 (P.L. 926) by Japanese nationals in the Philippines exploded to more than 200,000 hectares; by 1919 the Commonwealth government was concerned enough about Japanese corporate land-ownership to initiate the Land-Act of 1919 (P.L. 2874) which restricted land ownership to situations where 61% of ownership was Philippine or United States citizen. By the late 1930s there were more than 350 Japanese-owned businesses in the Philippines - 80% had ten or fewer employees. About 19,000 Japanese nationals lived and worked in the Philippines before December 1941; most municipalities in northern Luzon housed at least one Japanese-owned business, whose proprietor's primary loyalty was to his homeland. Very few of them were spies, but they provided a continuous stream of vital political, economic, and logistical information to those who were.

On December 10, 1941, elements of the Japanese 14th Army landed at Aparri, Cagayan and marched inland to take Tuguegarao by the 12th. Hapless regular Philippine Army (PA) units of the 11th Division surrendered or fled. While Gen.Homma's main force proceeded to Ilocos Norte along the coast, troops were also deployed to administer the agriculturally rich Cagayan Valley and facilitate Japanese expropriation of both food supplies (which included butchering of more than half of farmers' carabao for meat to feed their army) and the equipment to produce them. In addition, the US military had destroyed communications infrastructure to prevent use by the Japanese invaders. By late 1942 food and other commodities for native residents of the Cagayan Valley region had become very scarce. Meanwhile, the Manila-based Second Philippine Republic of President Laurel encouraged collaboration with the Japanese. In these hard times for North Luzon, many individual Japanese soldiers established relationships with Filipino residents, married local women, and fathered children - demonstrating their expectation of becoming permanent (if superior) residents.

The U.S. armed forces Philippine and U.S. Army escapees hid in the mountains or valley villages; some engaged in small-scale guerrilla actions against the Japanese. In October 1942, Americans Lt. Col. Martin Moses, & Lt. Col. Arthur Noble attempted to organize a coordinated Northern Luzon guerrilla action; communications failed, however, and the attacks were unsuccessful. Nonetheless, the Japanese occupying the Cagayan Valley perceived a serious threat - they brought thousands of troops from the capture of Manila and Bataan to discourage any resistance in a fierce and indiscriminate manner. "(Local) leaders were killed or captured, civilians were robbed, tortured, and massacred, their towns and barrios were destroyed."

Surviving American Capt. Volckmann re-organized Moses and Noble's guerilla operation into the United States Army Forces in the Philippines – Northern Luzon (USAFIP-NL) in 1943 with a new focus on gathering intelligence. Based in the Cordilleras, his native forces (including a number of Gaddang) were effective, even though they ran great risks, and provided General MacArthur with important information about Japanese troop dispositions. Capt. Ralph Praeger operated semi-independently in the Cagayan Valley, supported by Cagayan Governor Marcelo Adduru, even successfully attacking Japanese installations at Tuguegarao before his "Cagayan-Apayo Force" (Troop C, 26th Cavalry) was destroyed in 1943.

In 1945, resistance forces also coordinated activity with the American invasion. Gaddang homelands actions in which local guerillas had a recognized impact include the flank actions at Balete Pass (now Dalton Pass) to open the Magat valley, destroying bridges on the Bagabag-Bontoc Road to cut off supplies for General Yamashita's 14th Army forces in the mountains and the drive from Cervantes to Mankayan that reduced the final Japanese stronghold at Kiangan.

Post-WWII 
On July 4, 1946,the Treaty of Manila established the Commonwealth of the Philippines as an independent nation.  Quickly ratified by the U.S. Senate and signed by President Harry Truman; it went into full force when approved by the newly-created government of the Commonwealth. But that new government faced enormous challenges.  "The close of the war found the Philippines with most of its physical capital demolished or impaired. Transportation and communication facilities were severely damaged, and agricultural production seriously depleted".

National political and economic developments immediately affected the Cagayan/Magat area (the Gaddang "homelands").  Access to northern Luzon was compromised by Hukbalahap activity in Bulacan and Nueva Ejica from 1946-1955, causing delays to infrastructure development. While the national economy made gains under President Quirino, much of it was due to reconstruction grants from the U.S., the benefits of which were diminished outside metro Manila.  The situation was exacerbated when President Garcia's 1958 National Economic Council Resolution No. 202 created major disincentives to foreign investment.  A global recession and commodity price inflation followed the end of the Vietnam war. The 20-year dictatorship of Marcos saw corruption and looting on an unprecedented scale. By the 1986 election, the nation was in a debt-crisis with a very high incidence of severe poverty.   In the thirty years from 1986-2016, the country has had a revolution, a new Constitution, five presidential administrations (none of which represented an electoral majority), and a successful presidential impeachment.

The population of the Philippines at independence was less than 17 million. By 2020, the Philippine Census passed 109 million and is forecast to grow to 200 million in the next forty years, even after losing large numbers of Filipino permanent emigrants to other countries. In the essentially-rural Gaddang "homelands" (Isabela, Nueva Vizcaya, and Quirino, plus adjoining municipalities in Cagayan and Mountain provinces) the rate of increase has surpassed the national level driven by the growth of large cities.  Growth had major effects on Gaddang communities: (a) enormous numbers of people relocated to the previously-uncrowded Magat/Cagayan valleys from other parts of the country, overwhelming original populations and regionally available resources to accommodate and integrate them; while (b) improved school facilities and resources have enabled educated Gaddang to emigrate.  Over fifty years, this population-shift swamped the indigenous Cagayan cultures.

Population growth in Northern Luzon was facilitated by infrastructure development.  In 1965, President Macapagal proposed a Pan-Philippine highway; the idea was adopted by his successor Marcos as part of his ambitious (and self-serving) program of public works.  The "Maharlika Highway," was implemented by making improvements to and connections between existing roads previously administered by Department of Public Works, Transportation and Communications.  Funding came from the World Bank, the Asian Highway project of the United Nations and a loan of more than US$30 million from Japan (segments were re-named the Philippine-Japanese Friendship Highway). In Northern Luzon an important component was National Route 5 from Plaridel to Aparri, built before WW2 by the US.  Improvements to pavment, roadbeds, and bridges were completed by the mid-1970s and modestly maintained for several decades.  In 1994, the Japanese provided another round of funding for improvements to accommodate significantly increased traffic in Luzon.  In 2004, the Philippines ratified the Intergovernmental Agreement on the Asian Highway Network, and the entire 3,500 km highway became AH26.

Other major infrastructure projects in Northern Luzon in this period include the Magat Dam power, irrigation, and flood-control project undertaken during the Marcos administration and financed by loans from the World Bank.  The national telecommunications network originally built by American firm GTE (though largely destroyed by US forces during WW2) was restored to pre-war levels by the 1950s. Japanese Overseas Economic Cooperation Fund loans were used in the 1980s for the Northern Luzon Communication Network Development Plan, providing telecommunications equipment to provide trunk cabling, microwave transmission equipment and major maintenance for extant infrastructure between 1983-1992.

During the American occupation, education in the Gaddang homelands was generally available for elementary grades 1-6. By the 1930s provincial rural high-schools were established providing education in forestry and market-agriculture, to introduce new crops and technologies.  Catholic missionary high-schools were founded in several larger municipalities, and a private high-school was established in Santiago City a few months prior to the Japanese invasion of 1941.  After the war, some of these schools were encouraged to add "college-departments", providing teacher, commerce, engineering, and nursing training and degrees. Early establishments included Ateneo de Tuguegarao (1947), St. Mary's College in Bayombong (1947), Santiago City's Northeastern College (1948), and Saint Ferdinand College in Ilagan City (1950).  Additional resources were devoted to some rural schools, enabling them to provide college-level instruction in mechanics and agriculture. By the 1990's, a four-year high school education was available to every child in Isabela and Nueva Vizcaya; vocational education was being organized under the Technical Education And Skills Development Authority (TESDA); and more than forty private and public colleges and universities offered education through post-graduate levels.

Indigenous rights period
US occupation of the Philippines engendered massive re-evaluation of land-tenure based on grants to the Crown of Spain and the Church during the Spanish period; this introduced early concepts of collective indigene rights. By 1919, P.L. 2874 incorporated recognition of advantages indigenous people accrued over Japanese, Chinese, and (non-US) foreign nationals.  The World Council of Churches began in 1948, introducing a world-wide focus on the situation of threatened indigenous cultures; The World Council of Indigenous Peoples was founded in 1975.  By the 1980s, a concern for activity addressing the rights of indigenous peoples around the world was being built into organizational missions of the United Nations, the World Bank, and the International Labor Organization. The 1987 Constitution provides "an unprecedented recognition of indigenous rights to their ancestral domain" (Art.II,sec.22; Art XII,sec.5; Art.XIV,sec.17).

In October 1997, the national legislature passed the Indigenous Peoples' Rights Act; the National Commission on Indigenous Peoples (NCIP) recognizes the Gaddang as one of the protected groups. Initially, there was uncertainty about which peoples were to be recognized; the 2000 Census identified 85 groups among which the Gaddang were included. Developments of political and administrative nature took several decades and in May 2014 the Gaddang were recognized as "an indigenous people with political structure" with a certification of "Ancestral Domain Title" presented by NCIP commissioner Leonor Quintayo. Starting in 2014 the process of 'delineation and titling the ancestral domains" was begun; the claims are expected to "cover parts of the municipalities of Bambang, Bayombong, Bagabag, Solano, Diadi, Quezon and Villaverde". In addition, under the Indigenous Peoples Rights Act, certified indigenous peoples have a right to education in their mother-tongue; this education is as yet unimplemented by any organization with significant funding.

At present, a Nueva Vizcaya Gaddang Indigenous People's Organization has been formed, and by 2019 this group has been involved with coming to an agreement with agencies developing irrigation projects in Bayombong and Solano. The organization is also actively pursuing cultural expositions.  There will inevitably be conflicts between the assertion of Gaddang rights and growth-driven development; in Nueva Vizcaya the attempts of OceanaGold to continue mining despite the expiration of their permit and active legal opposition directly affects the Gaddang homelands. With a population today not significantly larger than estimated by Fr. Antolin in the 1780s, the future of the Gaddang people remains a question.

Culture

Language 
The Philippines National Commission for Culture and the Arts speaks of "five recognized dialects of Gaddang (Gaddang proper, Yogad, Maddukayang, Katalangan, and Iraya)", more distantly-related to Ibanag, Itawis, Malaueg, and others. Gaddang is distinct because it features phonemes (the "F", "V", "Z", and "J" sounds) not often present in many neighboring Philippine languages. There are also notable differences from other languages in the distinction between "R" and "L", and the "F" sound is a voiceless bilabial fricative, and not the fortified "P" sound common in many Philippine languages (but not much closer to the English voiceless labiodental fricative, either). The Spanish-derived "J" sound (not the "j") has become a plosive. Gaddang is noteworthy for the common use of doubled consonants (e.g.: pronounced Gad-dang instead of Ga-dang).

Gaddang is declensionally, conjugationally, and morphologically agglutinative, and is characterized by a dearth of positional/directional adpositional adjunct words. Temporal references are usually accomplished using context surrounding these agglutinated nouns or verbs.

The Gaddang language is identified in Ethnologue, Glottolog, and is incorporated into the Cagayan language group in the system of linguistic ethnologist Lawrence Reid. The Dominican fathers assigned to Nueva Viscaya parishes produced a vocabulary in 1850 (transcribed by Pedro Sierra) and copied in 1919 for the library of the University of Santo Tomas by H. Otley Beyer. In 1965 Estrella de Lara Calimag produced a word-list of more than 3,200 Gaddang words included in her dissertation at Columbia. The Austronesian Basic Vocabulary Database lists translations of more than two hundred English terms on its Gaddang page.

Daily use of Gaddang as a primary language has been declining during the last seventy years. During the first years of the American occupation, residents of Nueva Vizcaya towns used to schedule community events (eg: plays or meetings) to be held in Gaddang and the next day in Ilokano, in order to ensure everyone could participate and enjoy them. Teachers in the new American schools had to develop a curriculum for pupils who spoke entirely different languages:  The use of English in the schools of Isabela and Nueva Vizcaya, as well as in community functions, was only discouraged with the adoption of the 1973 Constitution and its 1976 amendments. A more urgent push to nationalize language was made in the 1987 Constitution, which had the unanticipated effect of marginalizing local languages even further. Television and official communications have almost entirely used the national Filipino language for nearly a generation.

Highlands culture 
Many writers on tourism and cultural artifacts appear enamoured of the more-exotic cultural appurtenances of the highlands Gaddang (Ga'dang), and pay little attention to the more-numerous "assimilated" Christianized families. Their narrative follows from the initial American assumption that lowland Gaddang originated with the highlands groups who subsequently became Christianized, then settled in established valley communities, acquiring the culture and customs of the Spanish, Chinese, and the other lowlands peoples. Many of them also distinguish the Gaddang residents of Ifugao and Apayo from other mountain tribes primarily by dress customs without considering linguistic or economic issues.  It is undeniable, however, that the "transactional" daily life of ordinary highlands Gaddang is enough different from that of their lowlands relations to identify them as culturally-distinct.

Dedman College (Southern Methodist University) Professor of Anthropology Ben J. Wallace has lived among and written extensively about highland Gaddang since the 1960s. His recent book (Weeds, Roads, and God, 2013) explores the transition these traditional peoples are making into the modern rural Philippines, taking on more customs and habits of the lowlands Gaddang, and discarding some colorful former behaviors.

Through the end of the 20th century, some traditional highlands Gaddang practiced kannyaw - a ritual including feasting, gift-giving, music/dance, ancestral recollections and stories - similar to potlatch - which was intended to bring prestige to their family.

The tradition of taking heads for status and/or redressing a wrong appears to have ended after WWII, when taking heads from the Japanese seems to have been less satisfactory than from a personal enemy. Both men and women lead and participate in religious and social rituals.

Class and economy 
Interviews in the mid-20th century identified a pair of Gaddang hereditary social classes: kammeranan and aripan. These terms have long fallen into disuse, but comparing old parish records with landholdings in desirable locations in Bagabag, Bayombobg, and Solano indicates that some real effects of class distinctions remain active. The writer's Gaddang correspondents inform him that aripan is similar in meaning to the Tagalog word alipin ("slave" or "serf"); Edilberto K. Tiempo addressed issues surrounding the aripan heritage in his 1962 short story To Be Free.

During the first decades of the American occupation, a major effort to eradicate slavery terminated the widespread practice of purchasing Igorot and other uplands children and youths for household and farm labor. Many of the individuals so acquired were accepted as members of the owner-families (although often with lesser status) among all the Cagayan Valley peoples. Present-day Gaddang do not continue to regularly import highland people as a dependent-class as they did until a generation ago. There still remains the strong tradition of bringing any unfortunate relatives into a household, which frequently includes a reciprocal geas on beneficiaries to "earn their keep".

There does not seem to have been a Cagayan Valley analogue of the wealthy Central Luzon landowner class until the agricultural expansion of the very late nineteenth century; most of those wealthy Filipinos were of Ilokano or Chinese ancestry.

Records over the last two centuries do show many Gaddang names as land and business owners, as well as in positions of civic leadership. The Catholic church also offered career opportunities. Gaddang residents of Bayombong, Siudad ng Santiago, and Bagabag enthusiastically availed themselves of the expanded education opportunities available since the early 20th century (initially in Manila, but more recently in Northern Luzon), producing a number of doctors, lawyers, teachers, engineers, and other professionals by the mid-1930s. A number also enlisted in the U.S. military service as a career (the U.S. Army Philippine Scouts being considered far superior to the Philippine Army).

Status of women and minor children 
Lowlands Gaddang women regularly own and inherit property, they run businesses, pursue educational attainment, and often serve in public elected leadership roles. Well-known and celebrated writer Edith Lopez Tiempo was born in Bayombong of Gaddang descent.

As mentioned above, there appear to be no prevailing rules of exogamy or endogamy which affect women's status or treatment. Both men and women acquire status by marriage, but there are acceptable pathways to prestige for single women in the Church, government, and business.

Kinship 
The Gaddang as a people have lacked a defined and organized political apparatus; in consequence, their shared-kinship is the means of ordering their social world.  During their pre-Conquest days, their swidden economy forced a small population to be dispersed in a fairly large area.  In a period where hostilities were a recurring phenomenon, expressed in head-taking and revenge, kinship obligations were the linkage between settlements; such kin-links include several (like solyad - or temporary marriage) which have no counterparts in modern law.

As has been documented with other Indo-Malay peoples, Gaddang kin relationships are highly ramified and recognize a variety of prestige markers based on both personal accomplishment and obligation (frequently transcending generations).  While linguistically there appear to be no distinctions beyond the second degree of consanguinity, tracing common lineal descent is important, and the ability to do so is traditionally admired and encouraged.  Relationships are traced through both patrilineal and matrilineal descent, but may also include compadre/co-madre links (often repeated across several generations), and even mentorship relationships.

It is unclear to what degree kinship-systems include mailan and other remnants of the slavery-system.

Funerary practices 
Modern Christian Gaddang funerals are most commonly entombed in a public or private cemetery, following a Mass celebration and a procession (with a band if possible). A wake is held for several days before the services, allowing family members and friends travel-time to view the deceased in the coffin. Mummification is not usually practiced, but cremation - followed by entombment of the ashes - has been observed.

Supernatural traditions 
Stories of ghosts, witchcraft, and supernatural monsters (eg: the Giant Snake of Bayombong) are a popular pastime, with the tellers most often relating them as if these were events in which they (or close friends/family) had participated. Various "superstitions" have been catalogued.

While assertively Christian, lowland Gaddangs retain strong traditions of impairment and illness with a supernatural cause; some families continue to practice healing traditions which were documented by Father Godfrey Lambrecht, CICM, in Santiago during the 1950s. These include the shamanistic practices of the mailan, both mahimunu (who function as augurs and intermediaries), and the maingal ("sacrificers" or community leaders–whom Lambrecht identifies with ancestral head-hunters). The spirits that cause such diseases are karangat (cognates of which term are found among the Yogad, the Ibanag karango, and the Ifugao calanget); each being is associated with a physical locality and is considered the "owner" of the land; they are not revenants; they are believed to cause fevers, but not abdominal distress. It is believed as well that Caralua na pinatay (ghosts) may cause illness to punish Gaddang who diverge from custom or can visit those facing their impending demise.

The upland "Pagan" Gaddang share these traditions, and in their animistic view, both the physical and the spiritual world are uncertain and likely hostile.  Any hurts which cannot be immediately attributed to a physical cause (eg: insect/animal bites, broken limbs, falls, and other accidents) are thought to be the work of karangat  in many forms not shared with the lowlanders.  They may include the deadly (but never-seen) agakokang which makes the sound of a yapping dog; aled who disguise themselves a pigs, birds, or even humans, infecting those they touch with a fatal illness; the vaporous aran which enters a person's brain and causes rapidly-progressing idiocy and death; or the shining-eyed bingil ghouls.  To assist their journey through such a dangerous world, the Gaddang rely on mediums they term mabayan (male mediums) or makamong (female), who can perform curative ceremonies.

Other folk-art traditions 

Three hundred years of Spanish/Catholic cultural dominion - followed by a nearly effective revolution - have almost completely diluted or even eradicated any useful pre-colonial literary, artistic or musical heritage of the lowland Cagayan peoples, including the Gaddang. Although the less-affected arts of the Cordillerans and some of the islanders south of Luzon are well-researched, even sixty years of strong national and academic interest has failed to uncover much tangible knowledge about pre-Spanish Cagayan valley traditions in music, plastic, or performing arts. A review of Maria Lumicao-Lorca's 1984 book Gaddang Literature states that "documentation and research on minority languages and literature of the Philippines are meager" That understood, however, there does exist a considerable record of Gaddang interest and participation in Luzon-wide colonial traditions, examples being Pandanggo sa ilaw, cumparsasa, and Pasyon; while the rise of interest in a cultural patrimony has manifested in an annual Nueva Vizcaya Ammungan (Gaddang for 'gather') festival adopted in 2014 to replace the Ilokano-derived Panagyaman rice-festival. The festival has included an Indigenous Peoples Summer Workshop, which has provincial recognition and status.

Some early 20th-century travelers report the use of gangsa in Isabela as well as among Paracelis Gaddang. This instrument was likely adopted from Cordilleran peoples, but provenance has not been established. The highlands Gaddang are also associated with the Turayen dance which is typically accompanied by gangsa.

Most Gaddang seem fond of riddles, proverbs, and puns (refer to Lumicao-Lorca); they also keep their tongue alive with traditional songs (including many harana composed in the early parts of the 20th century).  A well-known Gaddang language harana, revived in the 1970s and still popular today:

Indigenous mythology 
The Gaddang mythology includes a variety of deities:
Nanolay - Is both creator of all things and a cultural hero. In the latter role, he is a beneficent deity. Nanolay is described in myth as a fully benevolent deity, never inflicting pain or punishment on the people. He is responsible for the origin and development of the world.
Ofag - Nanolay's cousin.
Dasal - To whom the epic warriors Biwag and Malana prayed for strength and courage before going off to their final battle.
Bunag - The god of the earth.
Limat - The god of the sea.

Ethnography and linguistic research 
While consistently identifying the Gaddang as a distinct group, historic sources have done a poor job of recording specific cultural practices, and material available on the language has been difficult to access.

Early Spanish records made little mention of customs of the Ibanagic and Igaddangic peoples, being almost entirely concerned by economic events, and Government/Church efforts at replacing the chthonic cultures with a colonial model. The 1901 Philippine Commission Report states: "From Nueva Vizcaya, the towns make the common statement that there are no papers preserved which relate to the period of the Spanish government, as they were all destroyed by the revolutionary government." American occupation records, while often more descriptive and more readily available, perform only cursory discovery of existing behaviors and historic customs, since most correspondents were pursuing an agenda for change.

Records maintained by churches and towns have been lost; in Bagabag they were lost during the 1945 defense of the area by the Japanese 105th division under Gen. Konuma; a similar claim has been made for losses during Japanese occupation of Santiago beginning in 1942, and the USA-FIP liberation efforts of 1945. In Bayombong, St. Dominic's Catholic church (built in 1780) - a traditional repository for vital records - was destroyed by fire in 1892, and again in 1987.

In 1917 the Methodist Publishing House published Himno onnu canciones a naespirituan si sapit na "Gaddang (a set of hymns translated into Gaddang).  In 1919, H. Otley Beyer had the Dominican Gaddang-Spanish vocabulary copied for the library at University of Santo Tomas; the offices at St. Dominic's, Bayombong are presently unable to locate the original document.   In 1959, Madeline Troyer published an 8-page article on Gaddang Phonology, documenting work she had done with Wycliffe Bible Translators.

Father Godfrey Lambrecht, the rector of St. Mary's High School & College 1934-56, documented a number of linguistic and cultural behaviors in published articles. Several Gaddang have been pursuing family and Gaddang genealogy, including Harold Liban, Virgilio Lumicao, and Craig Balunsat.

During the late 1990s, a UST student attempted an "ethnobotanical" study, interviewing Isabela-area Gaddang about economically useful flora; this included notes on etymologic history and folk-beliefs.

Notes

References 

Indigenous peoples of Southeast Asia
Ethnic groups in the Philippines
Indigenous peoples of the Philippines
Ethnic groups in Luzon
Culture of Isabela (province)
History of Nueva Vizcaya
Culture of Nueva Vizcaya